Clean is the debut studio album by American indie rock singer-songwriter Soccer Mommy. It was released on March 3, 2018 through Fat Possum Records.

Critical reception

At Metacritic, which assigns a normalized rating out of 100 to reviews from music critics, Clean received an average score of 78, indicating "generally favorable reviews".

Accolades

Track listing

Personnel
Credits are adapted from the Clean liner notes.

 Sophie Allison – guitar; vocals; bass
 Julian Powell – lead guitar
 Nick Brown – drums
 Gabe Wax – piano; synthesizer; mellotron; bass; guitar; drum programming; percussion
 Roger Kleinman – piano; synth
 Ali Chant – mixing
 Sami Alam – front cover photo

References

External links
 Clean at Bandcamp

2018 debut albums
Soccer Mommy albums
Fat Possum Records albums